The Oxford Cheetahs are a British speedway team based at Oxford Stadium, in Oxford, England. They were founded in 1939 and are five times champions of Britain, in 1964, 1985, 1986, 1989 and 2001. The club folded in 2007 but in 2021, it was announced that the Oxford Cheetahs will make a long-awaited return to racing, participating in the SGB Championship 2022.

Throughout their history they ran under two other names, from 1972 to 1975, they were known as Oxford Rebels and from 2003 to 2005, they were known as Oxford Silver Machine. They also ran junior sides known as the Oxford Cubs, Oxford Silver Machine Academy, Oxford Lions and the Oxford Chargers.

History

1939-1948
The Oxford Motorcycle Speedway Club moved to Oxford Stadium in 1939 from a grass circuit in Sandford-on-Thames. The Secretary Ted Mander orchestrated the move and the first individual meeting was held on Easter Saturday 8 April 1939 won by Roy Duke. The club contested team meetings against Smallford, Wisbech, High Beech and Reading.

Racing resumed on 28 April 1940, with guest teams racing. This was followed by just two meetings in 1941 before Mander announced that racing would be suspended for the duration of the war. Despite the war ending in 1945 there was no racing from 1942 to 1948. However, during 1948 the stadium owner Leslie Calcutt unsuccessfully applied to the Speedway Control Board for a licence to race in the Third Division.

1949-1956
Following major track renovations in 1949, the club joined the 1949 Speedway National League Division Three. The club took the nickname 'Cheetahs' following a competition for the general public, held by the local Oxford Mail newspaper. The team manager was Ron Bear and the club colours were dark blue and yellow, with the first match being an away fixture at Exeter on 18 April 1949. Oxford lost heavily 60-24 and three days later lost to Hastings 47–37 in their first home fixture. The Cheetahs finished in last place during their inaugural season and used 24 different riders. The following season they won the division 3 league and cup double and were promoted to Division two in 1951. After finishing bottom of the division two in 1952 they rode in the third division called the Southern League in 1953 but following a league restructure returned to division two in 1954.

1957-1971
Following a league merger the Cheetahs rode in the top tier for the first time in 1957. After struggling in the top division for several years they dramatically won the top-tier league for the first time in 1964 despite finishing last the season before with many of the same riders. The winning team consisted of Arne Pander, Colin Gooddy, Colin McKee, Danny Dunton, Eddie Reeves, George Major, Jack Geran, Jimmy Gooch, John Bishop, Ron How and Ronnie Genz. They also completed a treble by winning the National Trophy and Britannia Shield. The team failed to emulate the success in the following seasons finishing mid-table for the next 7 years.

1972-1975
From 1972 to 1975, they were known as Oxford Rebels under promoters Danny Dunton and Bob Dugard. In what was to be the final year for the Rebels at Cowley Stadium, they won the Midland Cup against Wolverhampton Wolves under the captainship of Dag Lovaas.
Following the threat of track closure the promoters started a new team at White City called the White City Rebels leaving Oxford with no team or riders.

1976-1983
A new Oxford team were formed and entered division two, they took back the name Cheetahs with new promoters Harry Bastable and Tony Allsop after a committee of fans had created a "Save Our Stadium" campaign over the previous winter. The team competed for eight years in the division.

1984-1992
The golden period of Oxford speedway started in 1984. The stadium owners Northern Sports, headed by David Hawkins, invested heavily into the stadium with a £1.5 million three tier grandstand restaurant and sports centre. Hawkins installed Bernard Crapper and John Payne as speedway co-promoters and the team were entered for the 1984 British League season (the top league tier), with a new team that included Danish international Hans Nielsen (signed for £30,000) and Simon Wigg (£25,000). The team were champions of Britain in 1985, 1986 and 1989. In addition they won two British League Knockout Cups, a League Cup, Premiership and Gold Cup and paraded through Oxford on an open top bus.

1993-1997
Northern Sports parent company Hawkins of Harrow began to run into financial trouble and the team suffered lack of investment, Hans Nielsen left and the team applied to and raced in division two. They won the division two fours championship in 1994. Northern Sports were later liquidated, meaning the team was not financed by the stadium owners. Additionally in 1995 and 1996 there was only one division of British speedway meaning the Oxford Cheetahs returned to the top division under independent promoters. In 1997, another league restructure resulted in a new Elite League with the Premier League becoming division two, Oxford competed in the latter.

1998-2002
The team competed in the Elite League under new promotion from 1998 and in 2001 won their fifth top tier title. The team consisted of Aleš Dryml Jr., Andrew Appleton, Brian Andersen, Davey Watt, Leigh Adams, Lukáš Dryml, Steve Johnston and Todd Wiltshire and was promoted by Steve Purchase.

2003-2006
The Oxford Cheetahs were renamed for three seasons as the Oxford Silver Machine under the promotion of Nigel Wagstaff. In 2006 they reverted to their original name which was apt because it was their final full season as a top tier speedway team.

2007
Until 30 May 2007, they rode in the Elite League and operated a junior side known as the Oxford Lions which competed in the Conference League. In a statement issued by the British Speedway Promoters Association on 31 May 2007, their owner Colin Horton closed the club as a result of only 400–500 regular supporters attending home fixtures, and losing several thousand pounds every week.

In June 2007, businessman Allen Trump invested in the club (also sponsoring the club via LCD Publishing) to secure the lease on the track and the Cheetahs completed the 2007 season in the Conference League, replacing the Lions.

Closure
After the 2007 season, owner Allen Trump planned to bring the Cheetahs back into the Premier League for 2008. However, Trump was unable to secure a deal with landlords, the Greyhound Racing Association (GRA) to continue speedway racing at the Cowley stadium and handed the promotion back to the BSPA.

During the summer of 2008 Nick Andrews was granted permission to organise Conference League challenge fixtures featuring a touring side of ex-Oxford riders with a view to entering the team in the Premier League in 2009. Unfortunately, negotiations with the GRA were again unsuccessful and speedway did not return to Oxford. Despite having no league speedway for 14 years, there were still a number of committed fans keen to see the return of speedway to Oxford. Two supporters groups, the Oxford Speedway Supporters Club (OSSC) and Save Oxford Speedway (SOS) held regular events and trips for Oxford fans and actively campaigned for the return of speedway to Oxford.

2022 Return
On 11 November 2021, it was confirmed that the Cheetahs would return for the 2022 season in the SGB Championship, after a 14-year absence from British Speedway. Jamie Courtney would be the team promoter. The Cheetahs also ran a junior side called the Chargers for the 2022 National Development League speedway season.

Current Squads

Cheetahs (SGB Championship)

Chargers (National Development League)
 (C)

Historical teams

+ Elite League side withdrew from league

Season summary

First team

Season summary (juniors)

See also
List of United Kingdom Speedway League Champions
Knockout Cup (speedway)

Further reading 
 The Story of Oxford Speedway. (Robert Bamford and Glynn Shailes, 2007)

References

Sport in Oxford
Organisations based in Oxford
SGB Championship teams
1939 establishments in England